Noga (lit. Light of dawn) is a moshav in south-central Israel. Located in Hevel Lakhish between Ashkelon and Kiryat Gat, it falls under the jurisdiction of Lakhish Regional Council.

History
The moshav was founded in 1955 by Jewish refugees to Israel from the Kingdom of Iraq and Pahlavy Iran on part of the land of the depopulated Arab village of al-Faluja. The name "Noga" is symbolic of the brightness of Jewish Zionist settlement in Hevel Lakhish and named after Biblical Proverbs 4:18; "But the path of the righteous is as the light of dawn".

References

Moshavim
Populated places established in 1955
Populated places in Southern District (Israel)
1955 establishments in Israel
Iranian-Jewish culture in Israel
Iraqi-Jewish culture in Israel